"Two Gallants" is a short story by James Joyce published in his 1914 collection Dubliners. It tells the story of two Irishmen who are frustrated with their lack of achievement in life and rely on the exploitation of others to live. Joyce considered the story to be one of the most important in Dubliners.

Publication history
The London house of Grant Richards agreed to publish Dubliners in 1905, but there were printing complications and concerns of obscenity. One of the stories with passages in question was "Two Gallants."  Joyce questioned Richard's reluctance to publish by asking: "Is it the small gold coin in the former story or the code of honour which the two gallants live by which shocks him?" In another letter to Richards, Joyce voiced his fondness of the story saying: "to omit the story from the book would really be disastrous. It is one of the most important stories in the book. I would rather sacrifice five of the other stories (which I could name) than this one." Joyce redacted some words from the end product, but the story was kept in the collection, which was published by Richards nine years after Joyce originally submitted it in 1905.

Plot summary
In the evening, a young man named Corley is walking with his friend Lenehan  and telling him about a woman he has seduced. A rendezvous has been arranged with the woman and Corley, during which Lenehan wanders around Dublin before stopping at a refreshment house for a supper of peas and a bottle of ginger beer. During his solitude, Lenehan contemplates his current state; he is at the age of thirty-one, and is thoroughly unsatisfied with his life of leeching and "chasing the devil by his tail." He dreams of settling down with a "simple-minded" woman, who could provide him with money. After eating, Lenehan wanders around the streets aimlessly, hoping Corley will meet him at the previously arranged time. Corley presents him with a gold coin from the woman. The reader is never told how the woman acquired it, but it is implied that she either stole it from her employer on his behalf, or that it is the sum of her savings. This contrasts with Corley's descriptions of past relationships he had had, in which he spent money on women.

Analysis

Two Gallants is arguably a combination of naturalism, realism, and modernism. Naturalism portrays realistic events in a detached way, like realism, but there is an ideology of determinism. Corley and Lenehan are a product of their environment and circumstances. But from this naturalistic angle they are morally exempt, and it is suggested that it is a kind of ironic naturalism on Joyce’s part as a moral critique of the Irish resigning to their situation.

In the way in which Joyce resists the conventional narrative arc and leaves the story without clear conclusions, without clear meanings given to anything, one can see the modernist traits. The ambiguity about what it is that Corley must pull off, and the half-said things running through the dialogue, and the many symbols and allusions, make the text a job to decipher, in true modernist style.

One of the suggested themes of the story is betrayal – Corley is betrayed by society, due to the lack of opportunities for the middle and lower classes, so he becomes a betrayer. Some critics propose symbolism for a religious betrayal, that of Judas betraying Christ, but an inversion. The many orbs and circles in the text allude to the halo of Christ. The symbolism supports the socio-political betrayal and the religious betrayal simultaneously.

There is also the reading of the betrayal or contamination of Irish romantic ideals of the past. The harp is a symbol of Irish romanticism, and links with the idea of gallantry, which we are prepared for by the title, but meet the opposite of in the two main characters. A possible reading is that Corley and Lenehan are the corrupted idea of chivalry, or gallantry. The harp stands for the uncorrupted ideal, but her cover lies around her knees, like a violated woman and the servant girl Corley is about to swindle. The harp is weary of the eyes of strangers and her master’s hands, suggesting molestation and exploitation put on display.

The moon slowly being covered by rain clouds can also be read as the romantic ideal disappearing and being replaced by material gain. Corley holds up the coin like a knight who has found the grail, and the contrast to reality emphasizes the degeneration of morals.

References

External links
 

Short stories by James Joyce
1914 short stories